Aaron J. Simpson Smith is an American house music DJ from Chicago, Illinois. He is best known for recording a track called "Dancin which features female vocalist Luvli.

Although the track was recorded in 2004, it would finally take on a life of its own by the Summer of 2005 with the JJ Flores & Steve Smooth Remix as a major club hit in Europe and take off in a big way on Dance radio stations, where it would debut at number 21 on Billboard's Hot Dance Airplay chart the week ending January 2, 2006.

In 2013, the French duo Krono remixed the song under the Moody Recordings label. After the release, the song gained a new wave of popularity.

In December 2018, the "Dancin remix by DJ KRONO brought the original song back into popular consciousness.

In 2019, "Dancin was certified Silver by the British Phonographic Industry (BPI), followed by Gold in 2021 and Platinum in 2022.

References

External links
Aaron Smith's record label

American house musicians
American dance musicians
Year of birth missing (living people)
Living people